Una Margaret Patricia Kroll (nee Hill, 15 December 1925 – 6 January 2017) was a British nun, missionary doctor, priest, and campaigner for women's ordination.

Early life
Kroll was born in London, and grew up in Paris, Latvia, and London. Her father, George Alexander Hill (1892–1968), was the son of a timber merchant with business interests stretching from Siberia to Persia, and a British intelligence officer in the First and Second World Wars. Her mother Hilda Evelyn (née Pediani) was the daughter of an Italian tobacco merchant who had eloped from Constantinople with the Archbishop of Canterbury, Frederick Temple's niece, before settling in St Petersburg where they had seven children, the youngest of which was Hilda.  Hilda Pediani worked as a spy for the British and fell for "philandering" fellow spy George Hill, with Una conceived out of wedlock, and although her father bigamously married her mother before she was born, he left before she was two years old.

Kroll was educated St Paul's Girls' School, Malvern Girls College, and Girton College, Cambridge, from where she graduated with a degree in medicine.

Career
In the October 1974 general election, she stood for Parliament in Sutton and Cheam as an independent candidate on an equal opportunities platform.

After she was widowed at the age of 61, she became a nun.

In 1997, aged 72 and serving as a deacon in a Welsh parish, she was ordained as a priest by the then Bishop of Monmouth, Dr Rowan Williams.

In 2008, she converted to Catholicism.

Personal life
In 1957, she married Leopold Kroll, an American monk 25 years older than her who had brought her back to England from her work as a missionary doctor in Liberia after she fell ill. They had the first of four children in 1958, and moved to Namibia in 1959, where they became active in the anti-apartheid movement and were expelled from the country within two years.

Kroll died on 6 January 2017 at the age of 91.

Publications
 The Healing Potential of Transcendental Meditation, Atlanta : John Knox Press, 1974. , 
 Flesh of My Flesh, London, Longman and Todd, 1975
 Lament for a Lost Enemy, London : SPCK, 1977. , 
 Sexual Counselling, London : SPCK, 1980. , 
 Trees of Life, Mowbray, 1997
 Forgive and live, London : Mowbray, 2000. , 
 Anatomy of survival : steps on a personal journey towards healing, London : Continuum, 2001. , 
 Living Life to the Full : A Guide to Spiritual Health in Later Years, CIP Group Ltd., 2006. , 
 Bread Not Stones, London, Christian Alternative, 2014. ,

References

External links
 Una Kroll discusses the struggle for the ordination of women, British Library audio file, 3:57

1925 births
2017 deaths
20th-century English Anglican priests
Alumni of Girton College, Cambridge
Anglican missionaries in Liberia
Anglican priest converts to Roman Catholicism
British Anglican missionaries
British people of Italian descent
British Roman Catholics
Christian medical missionaries
Women Anglican clergy
Female Christian missionaries
Independent British political candidates
People educated at Malvern St James
People educated at St Paul's Girls' School
British expatriates in Liberia